The list of historical blockades informs about blockades that were carried out either on land, or in the maritime and air spaces in the effort to defeat opponents through denial of supply, usually to cause military exhaustion and starvation as an economic blockade in addition to restricting movement of enemy troops.

Ancient era

Medieval era

Early-modern era

Modern era

Current

See also
 List of naval battles
 Naval supremacy
 Economic warfare
 Embargo

References

Further reading
 
 
 

Military strategy
!